Edward Simpson may refer to:

Edward Simpson (naval officer) (1824–1888), officer in the U.S. Navy during the American Civil War and the Spanish–American War
Edward A. Simpson (1892–?), World War I flying ace
Edward B. Simpson (1835–1915), Wisconsin politician
Edward Simpson (governor), Naval commandant and 20th Naval Governor of Guam
Edward Sydney Simpson (1875–1939), Australian mineralogist and geochemist
Edward H. Simpson (1922–2019), British statistician
Edward Simpson (cricketer) (1867–1944), English cricketer 
Sir Edward Simpson (MP), British MP for Dover, 1759–1765
Edward Simpson (forger) (1815–?), British geologist and forger
Edward Simpson (Master of Trinity Hall, Cambridge) (died 1764),politician, lawyer and academic